The Iron Mountain was a stern-wheeler that plied the Mississippi River for ten years until sinking in 1882. The ship ran aground and sank in 1882. However, a common legend claims that it mysteriously disappeared.

Sinking

The Iron Mountain sailed from Vicksburg on March 25, 1882, and hit an obstruction at Stumpy Point, near Island 102, which holed her hull and sank her. The crew scrambled onto one of the barges and escaped. Ellen Anderson, a chambermaid/ship stewardess, was caught below decks and killed. Her body was recovered the next day with some wreckage, but there was no sign of the ship. Further wreckage was found on June 30, several miles from where the boat was lost. The sinking of the ship was reported locally, with articles appearing in the March 27 edition of the Vicksburg Daily Commercial, and the March 28 issue of the Daily Memphis Avalanche. The ship was not found until later, having apparently been refloated by flood waters and carried through a break in a levee, and grounded in a cotton field at Omega Landing, near Tallulah, Louisiana.

Legend

A common legend claims that it was travelling from New Orleans to Pittsburgh, loaded with cotton and sugar, when it disappeared. It sailed from Vicksburg, Mississippi, and headed north, towing a string of barges and with 55 crew and passengers aboard. Another steamer, the Iroquois Chief, found the Iron Mountains barges floating downriver, apparently having been cut loose, but the ship itself had vanished.

This legend is often repeated as fact, as in Frank Edward's 1956 book, Strangest of All, Paul Begg's Into Thin Air (1979), the Reader's Digest's Mysteries of the Unexplained (1982),  Louis L'Amour's The Haunted Mesa (1987), Charles Berlitz's World of Strange Phenomena (1988) and Herbie Brennan's Seriously Weird True Stories (1997). Most versions of the story give the date of the "disappearance" as 1872, which was the year of the ship's launching.

In popular culture

The legend was indirectly shown in the 2011 science fiction Western film Cowboys and Aliens.  In this film there is a scene where a posse discover an upturned Mississippi riverboat in the middle of the desert in New Mexico.  Although the boat's name is not shown or mentioned, it is presumed that it is the Iron Mountain that was dropped there by the extraterrestrials.

References

External links
 

1872 ships
Ships built in Pittsburgh
Shipwrecks of the Mississippi River
Steamboats of the Mississippi River
Maritime incidents in March 1882
Ice trade
Legendary ghost ships
American folklore